The Rugby World Cup is the women's rugby union world championship which is organised by World Rugby. The first Rugby World Cup for women was held in 1991, but it was not until the 1998 tournament that the tournament received official backing from the International Rugby Board (IRB, now World Rugby); by 2009, the IRB had retroactively recognized the 1991 and 1994 tournaments and their champions. 

Normally, the tournament is held every four years. With the exception of the 2018 edition that was brought forward to 2017 f to be a change of cycle
and the 2021 edition that was postponed to 2022, due to the COVID-19 pandemic.

Three countries have won the women's Rugby World Cup since its establishment, with New Zealand having won the tournament a record six times.

The championship was previously branded as the Women's Rugby World Cup. As part of an effort to promote greater parity between the championship and its men's counterpart, the Rugby World Cup, World Rugby announced in 2019 that the women's championship would be officially marketed under the title Rugby World Cup, with no gender designation, beginning in 2021.

History

1990s
Before the first Women's Rugby World Cup officially sanctioned by the International Rugby Board there had been three previous tournaments of a similar nature. The first of these was an event held in August 1990 in New Zealand. Though not considered a world cup, the tournament was referred to as the World Rugby Festival for Women. The competition included teams representing the United States, the Netherlands, Russia, and the hosts, New Zealand – who emerged as winners after defeating the United States in the final.

The first tournament referred to as the Women's Rugby World Cup was held in 1991 and hosted by Wales. Twelve countries were divided into four groups of three. The United States, against expectations, took the first championship with a 19–6 victory over England. In the Plate competition Canada prevailed over Spain 18–4. Following the first tournament, it was decided to move the tournament schedule to the year prior to the next men's world cup, therefore reducing the quadrennial cycle to just three years.

The next event was originally scheduled to take place in Amsterdam but ended up being moved to Scotland. Eleven countries competed in the tournament with the English meeting the United States in the final for the second time; however, in this instance England emerged as winners.

The 1998 tournament became the first women's world cup officially sanctioned by the International Rugby Board. Amsterdam, who were originally scheduled to host the previous world cup, hosted the largest ever tournament with all matches played at the new National Rugby Centre in the city's west end. The tournament also saw a record sixteen teams compete. New Zealand, who withdrew from the previous tournament, also competed. The final saw New Zealand defeat the United States and claim their first world cup title.

2000–present
The next event was taken to Spain in 2002. New Zealand won the title for the second time by defeating England 19–9 in the final.

The 2006 World Cup took place in Edmonton, Canada, and was the first major international rugby union tournament and women's world cup held in North America. New Zealand defeated England in the final to win their third successive world cup title.

A record four countries expressed interest in hosting the 2010 World Cup. After considering bids from England, Germany, Kazakhstan and South Africa, the IRB announced that the 2010 event would take place in England. The tournament was staged in London, with the final played at the Twickenham Stoop.

The 2017 World Cup was hosted by the Irish Rugby Football Union, which governs the sport on an All-Ireland basis. Games were held in Dublin in the Republic of Ireland and in Belfast in Northern Ireland. The tournament was held one year earlier than usual in order to re-align the Women's Rugby World Cup's scheduling for greater synergy with the Summer Olympics (which would be held one year prior; rugby sevens debuted in 2016) and Rugby World Cup Sevens (one year after). The tournament was to return to a four-year cycle afterward, with the 2021 Women's Rugby World Cup awarded to New Zealand. 

In August 2019, World Rugby announced that in an effort to "elevate the profile of the women's game", the women's championship will be marketed under the "Rugby World Cup" branding, with no gender designation, beginning in 2021. World Rugby stated that the decision was intended to promote gender equality and "[eliminate] any inherent or perceived bias" towards men's events, with chairman Bill Beaumont explaining that it "demonstrates our ongoing and unwavering commitment to advancing women in rugby both on and off the field in line with our ambitious strategic plan." World Rugby became the first major sports federation to rebrand its events in such a way.

The 2021 tournament in New Zealand was postponed by one year to 2022 due to the COVID-19 pandemic; it will still be branded as the 2021 Rugby World Cup.

From 2025 the competition finals will be expanded to 16 teams, from the 12 competing in 2021. On 12 May 2022, World Rugby announced that England, Australia and the United States would host the next three women's tournaments in 2025, 2029, and 2033 respectively. As part of a new strategy, Australia and the United States were also awarded the preceding men's tournaments in 2027 and 2031 respectively—marking the first time that the men's and women's Rugby World Cup will be held successively in the same host nation.

Results

Tournaments

Team records

Participating nations

Q = nation qualified for Final Tournament not yet played
w = nation withdrew from (final) Tournament
e = nation eliminated in qualifying stage and did not reach Final Tournament
– = nation did not enter competition.

The following nations have participated in qualifying stages, but have never reached the Final Tournament:

e = nation eliminated in qualifying stage and did not reach Final Tournament
w = nation withdrew from qualifying stage
p = nation possibly eliminated in qualifying stage and will need to be successful in Repechage in order to reach Final Tournament
– = nation did not enter qualifying stage competition.

Apart from the African region, the nations involved in the continental qualifying stages have not been announced as at 20 October 2019.

Refereeing

Final referees

 1991:  Les Peard
 1994:  Jim Fleming
 1998:  Ed Morrison
 2002:  Giulio De Santis
 2006:  Simon McDowell
 2010:  Sarah Corrigan
 2014:  Amy Perrett
 2017:  Joy Neville
 2021:  Hollie Davidson

Format
The format for the 2006 tournament split the 12 participating nations into four pools of three teams. Each nation played three games, after the completion of which a re-seeding process took place. Nations were moved into divisions dictated by their respective overall tournament ranking with the top teams proceeding to the knockout stages.

The 2010 event maintained the number of teams participating at twelve, with regional qualifying tournaments. The 2021 tournament retained the same format, but with the classification round replaced with quarter-finals, as with the men's Rugby World Cup. In 2025, the tournament will expand to 16 teams.

Media coverage
The tournament has grown considerably in the past fifteen years although television audiences and event attendance still remain relatively low, especially in comparison to other women's world cup events. The final of the 2006 event in Canada was broadcast in a number of countries and streamed live via the internet.

Sky Sports broadcast 13 live matches from the 2010 Women’s Rugby World Cup, including the semi-finals, the third and fourth place play-off match and the final. The pool matches shown included all of England's matches, while each of the home nations' featured live too. There were also highlights shown from all other matches during the pool stages.

In Ireland the Women's Rugby World Cup was broadcast by TG4 in 2014, the Irish language channel received praise for airing the tournament. TG4 provided coverage to all of the Irish matches as well as the final and semi-final.

Certain matches in the 2017 WRWC knockout phases drew strong TV viewership in England and France, and were broadcast live in the United States.

In 2017, ITV started televising Women’s Rugby Union World Cup matches on free-to-air TV for the first time in history, starting with the 2017 Women’s Rugby World Cup in Ireland.

See also

 Rugby World Cup (men)
Women's rugby union
Women's international rugby
Women's Rugby League World Cup

References

External links

 
 Women's Rugby World Cup from therugbyworldcup.co.uk (archived)
 Women's Rugby World Cup (1991–2017) at rugbyfootballhistory.com

 
World Cup
World Cup, Women's
Recurring sporting events established in 1991
World Rugby competitions
World cups